Ted Page (born June 11, 1942) is a former defensive back in the Canadian Football League  (CFL) who played on two Grey Cup winning teams.

A North Bay, Ontario native, Page started his career with the Montreal Alouettes, playing 38 regular season games. He next moved to the Hamilton Tiger-Cats, where he won 2 Grey Cups in 6 years, and finished his football career with the Edmonton Eskimos in 1971. He was mostly adept as a defensive back, intercepting a career-high of 4 balls with the Tiger Cats in 1965 and 1969, but was also used as a punt returner and a kick returner, scoring one touchdown as the latter in 1964.

References

1942 births
Living people
Edmonton Elks players
Hamilton Tiger-Cats players
Montreal Alouettes players
El Camino College Compton Center alumni
California State University, Los Angeles alumni
Players of Canadian football from Ontario
Sportspeople from North Bay, Ontario